Tupã Futebol Clube, or simply Tupã, is a Brazilian football team based in Tupã, São Paulo. Founded in 1936, it plays in Campeonato Paulista Segunda Divisão.

History
The club was founded on August 4, 1936, professionalized its football department in 1945 and played its first professional competition, which was the Campeonato Paulista Série A2, in that year.

Stadium
Tupã Futebol Clube play their home games at Estádio Alonso de Carvalho Braga. The stadium has a maximum capacity of 5,515 people.

References

Association football clubs established in 1936
Football clubs in São Paulo (state)
1936 establishments in Brazil